Cyrtopodium aliciae is a species of orchid endemic to Brazil.

References 

aliciae
Orchids of Brazil
Plants described in 1892